Events from the year 1721 in Ireland.

Incumbent
Monarch: George I

Events
June 24 – an act of the Parliament of Great Britain permits Charles Butler, 1st Earl of Arran, to purchase the Irish estates forfeited by his brother James Butler, 2nd Duke of Ormonde.
The office of Lord Chancellor of Ireland is the highest political office in the Parliament of Ireland; Viscount Midleton being the incumbent.
The title Baron Bessborough, of Bessborough, Piltown in the County of Kilkenny, is created in the Peerage of Ireland in favour of William Ponsonby.

Births
Henry Jones, poet and tragedian (d. 1770)
Denis Maguire, Bishop (Catholic Church) (d. 1798)
Robert Murray, merchant (d. 1786)
Peter Parker, Admiral of the Fleet (d. 1811)
John Ruxton, landowner and politician (d. 1785)
Approximate date
Richard Houston, mezzotint engraver (d. 1775)
Alexander Montgomery, soldier and politician (d. 1785)

Deaths

July 21 (hanged) – Walter Kennedy, pirate (b. c.1695)
September 20 – Thomas Doggett, actor and benefactor (b. c.1670)
Autumn – Godfrey Boate, judge (b. 1673)
Denis Daly, judge (b. c.1638)
Sir John Kirwan, merchant (b. 1650)

References

 
Years of the 18th century in Ireland
1720s in Ireland